That's Right may refer to:

 "That's Right" (Carl Perkins song)
 That's Right!, an album by Nat Adderley
 That's Right!, an album by Benny Green
 "That's Right" (Ciara song)
 "That's Right" (Three 6 Mafia song)
 "That's Right (You're Not from Texas)", a song by Lyle Lovett
 "That's Right", song by Big Kuntry King from My Turn to Eat
 That's Right, an album by George Benson
 That's Right!, an album by Victor Bailey